Emkej is a Slovenian rapper and founder of Wudisban Records from Maribor, Slovenia. He is also one of the most recognizable Slovenian hip hop figures and a member of hip hop group Tekochee Kru.

Early career
Emkej started his rap career at a local group called B-Squad, formed with his friend Sniki and his neighbour Kato, who was the group's producer. Together they recorded music mostly at home and appeared at various local hip hop shows.

Tekochee Kru and later career
In 2005, Emkej and Sniki joined one of Maribor's best known hip hop groups, Tekochee Kru. The first quickly established himself as the most prolific rapper among 7 members, appearing the most on their studio debut and also releasing his solo effort, titled 'Šmorn' in 2010. He continued touring the nation and released his second album in 2012.

Discography

Solo albums
 Šmorn (2010)
 Znajdi se (2012)
 Probaj razumet (2017)
 VKBTM (2021)

Other
 adijo stari, kaki scenarij (with Tekochee Kru) (2007)
 Božja Gamad (with Velebor) (2013)
 Cifre (with DJ Splif) (2013)
 Sabljasti tiger (with Tekochee Kru) (2014)
 Probam Razumet (with Roots in Session) (2018)

References

Slovenian rappers
Living people
Year of birth missing (living people)
Musicians from Maribor